Timalus leucomela is a moth in the subfamily Arctiinae. It was described by Francis Walker in 1856. It is found in Panama and Brazil (Upper Amazonas, Pará).

References

Moths described in 1856
Arctiinae